Nagaland Nationalist Organisation was a political party in Nagaland, India. It formed the government in Nagaland from 1964 to 1974.

Nagaland was converted to a state by the State of Nagaland Act, 1962 and elections were called for in 1964. There were no political parties registered for the first elections and so all the candidates, many of whom were members of the Nagaland National Organisation, fought as Independents.

In 1976, it merged with the Indian National Congress.

Chief Ministers

Electoral history

State
Elections to the Nagaland Legislative Assembly:

National
Elections for the Nagaland (Lok Sabha constituency):

References

Defunct political parties in Nagaland
Political parties disestablished in 1976